Bahrain will compete at the 2019 World Athletics Championships in Doha, Qatar, from 27 September to 6 October 2019. Bahrain will be represented by 21 athletes.

Medalists

Results

Men
Track and road events

Women 

Track and road events

Field events

Mixed

Track and road events

References

External links
Doha｜WCH 19｜World Athletics

Nations at the 2019 World Athletics Championships
World Athletics Championships
Bahrain at the World Championships in Athletics